Tybo may refer to:

Places in Nevada, United States
 Tybo, Nevada, an unincorporated community
 Tybo Charcoal Kilns, a pair of charcoal kilns in Nye County
 Tybo Shale, a geologic formation

Other uses
 Tybo cheese, a Danish cow's milk cheese
 Chloronycta tybo, a species of moth